Louisiana stayed at eight house seats following the 1970 census, but the Eighth District's boundaries were radically altered. New governor Edwin W. Edwards, who resigned his seat as Seventh District Representative on May 9, ordered the district to take in territory far to the south and east of its traditional base of Alexandria, which included many African-American and progressive white voters. The change was largely regarded as an election deal between Edwards and former Rep. Gillis Long, who finished third in the Democratic Primary in the 1971 Louisiana Governor's Election. Long easily won back the Eighth District seat he lost in 1964 to his cousin Speedy O. Long, whose home in Jena was moved into the Fifth District in the 1972 redistricting. Speedy Long retired rather than challenge entrenched Fifth District Rep. Otto Passman. 

Edwards' Seventh District seat was filled by chief aide John Breaux, who won simultaneous elections for the remainder of Edwards' term and the full term to the next Congress. The special election was run under the boundaries used in 1968 and 1970; the election for the full term was run under the new boundaries approved by the Louisiana Legislature during its 1972 regular session.  

All five incumbents (not including Breaux) who ran for re-election won: F. Edward Hebert (1st), Hale Boggs (2nd; see below), Joe Waggoner (4th), Passman (5th) and John Rarick (6th).

In addition to Speedy Long, Third District Rep. Patrick T. Caffery chose not to seek re-election to a third term. He was succeeded by Dave Treen, who became the first Republican elected to Congress from Louisiana since Reconstruction following the Civil War.

Second District Rep. Hale Boggs, the House Majority Leader during the 92nd Congress, was declared missing three weeks prior to the election when a plane carrying him and Alaska Rep. Nick Begich was lost in the Alaska wilderness. Boggs was declared dead at the beginning of the 93rd Congress and his seat vacated; his widow Lindy won a special election for the seat in March 1973.

See also 
 List of United States representatives from Louisiana
 United States House of Representatives elections, 1972

1972
Louisiana
United States House of Representatives